The Jacobina mine is one of the largest gold mines in the Brazil, and in the world. 

The mine is located in Bahia state, in the eastern region of Brazil . 

The mine has estimated reserves of 4.5 million oz of gold.  It is owned by Yamana Gold.

See also
Brazilian Gold
List of mines in Brazil

References 

Gold mines in Brazil
Geography of Bahia